Reed Friar Juntilla (born June 22, 1984) is a Filipino professional basketball player who is currently a free agent. Juntilla last played for the Zamboanga Valientes of the Pilipinas VisMin Super Cup.

Career
Juntilla played for Mail and More Comets and Hapee Toothpaste in the Philippine Basketball League. He was eligible for the 2007 PBA draft but no team drafted him. His skills is common to Cyrus Baguio, a slasher and a shooter. He was signed as a free agent by Red Bull in 2008.

After the 2008 PBA Fiesta Conference ended, Juntilla faced possible revocation of his contract for going AWOL. Then-Barako Bull coach Yeng Guiao wanted Juntilla to be waived because of his sudden absence just after signing a two-year contract with the team. After that incident, he has since returned to Barako Bull.

Before the playoffs of the 2010–11 PBA Philippine Cup, he and Mark Isip were traded to Bolts in a three-team, eight-player trade.

His stint with the Bolts was short-lived as he was traded again, this time to the Air21 Express along with Jay-R Reyes.

References

1984 births
Living people
Air21 Express players
Barako Bull Energy Boosters players
Basketball players from Cebu
Filipino men's basketball players
NorthPort Batang Pier players
Meralco Bolts players
Philippine Patriots players
Point guards
Shooting guards
Sportspeople from Cebu City
Cebuano people
Maharlika Pilipinas Basketball League players
UV Green Lancers basketball players
Filipino men's 3x3 basketball players
PBA 3x3 players
Zamboanga Valientes players